The 2024 United States House of Representatives elections in Nevada will be held on November 5, 2024, to elect the four U.S. representatives from the State of Nevada, one from all four of the state's congressional districts. The elections will coincide with the 2024 U.S. presidential election, as well as other elections to the House of Representatives, elections to the United States Senate, and various state and local elections.

District 1

The 1st district expands from inner Las Vegas towards its southeastern suburbs and some rural parts of Clark County, taking in the cities of Paradise, Henderson, and Boulder City. The incumbent is Democrat Dina Titus, who was reelected with 51.6% of the vote in 2022.

Democratic primary

Candidates

Potential
Dina Titus, incumbent U.S. Representative

Republican primary

Candidates

Filed paperwork
Flemming Larsen, restaurateur
Mark Robertson, professor, retired U.S. Army colonel, and nominee for this district in 2022

General election

Predictions

District 2

The 2nd district includes White Pine County and part of Lyon County, and contains the cities of Reno, Sparks, and Carson City. The incumbent is Republican Mark Amodei, who was reelected with 59.7% of the vote in 2022.

Republican primary

Candidates

Declared
Mark Amodei, incumbent U.S. Representative

General election

Predictions

District 3

The 3rd district comprises the western Las Vegas suburbs, including Spring Valley, Summerlin South, and Sandy Valley. The incumbent is Democrat Susie Lee, who was reelected with 52.0% of the vote in 2022.

Democratic primary

Candidates

Potential
Susie Lee, incumbent U.S. Representative

Republican primary

Candidates

Declared
Elizabeth Helgelien, former state senator

General election

Predictions

District 4

The 4th district covers parts of northern Las Vegas, taking in the Las Vegas Strip, as well as its northern suburbs and rural central Nevada. The incumbent is Democrat Steven Horsford, who was reelected with 52.4% of the vote in 2022.

Democratic primary

Candidates

Potential
Steven Horsford, incumbent U.S. Representative

Republican primary

Candidates

Declared
David Flippo, financial advisor and retired U.S. Air Force lieutenant colonel

General election

Predictions

References

External links
Official campaign websites for District 4 candidates
David Flippo (R) for Congress

2024
Nevada
United States House of Representatives